Mikhail Elgin and Alexander Kudryavtsev were the defending champions but chose not to defend their title.

Sander Arends and Sander Gillé won the title after defeating Luca Margaroli and Tristan-Samuel Weissborn 6–2, 6–3 in the final.

Seeds

Draw

References
 Main Draw

Trofeo Città di Brescia - Doubles
2017 Doubles